The Flaming Disc is a 1920 American silent adventure film serial directed by Robert F. Hill. The first episode of the series, "Rails of Death", opened on November 21, 1920. A total of 18 film episodes were produced. The Flaming Disc is now presumed to be a lost film.

Cast
 Elmo Lincoln as Elmo Gray / Jim Gray
 Louise Lorraine as Helen
 Monte Montague as Bat
 Lee Kohlmar as Prof. Wade
 George B. Williams as Stanley Barrows (credited as George Williams)
 Jenks Harris as Con
 Ray Watson as Rodney Stanton
 Fred Hamer as Briggs
 Fay Holderness
 Bob Reeves

Episode titles
 "Rails of Death" 
 "Span of Life" 
 "Perilous Leap"
 "Fires of Hate" 
 "Vanishing Floor" 
 "Pool of Mystery" 
 "Circle of Fire" 
 "Through Walls of Steel" 
 "The Floating Mine" 
 "Spiked Death" 
 "The Dynamite Trail" 
 "The Tunnel of Flame" 
 "Caged In" 
 "The Purple Rays" 
 "Poisoned Waters" 
 "Running Wild" 
 "Rails of Destruction" 
 "End of the Trail"

See also
 List of American films of 1920
 List of film serials
 List of film serials by studio
 List of lost films

References

External links

1920 films
1920 adventure films
1920 lost films
American adventure films
American silent serial films
American black-and-white films
Films directed by Robert F. Hill
Lost American films
Universal Pictures film serials
1920s American films
Silent adventure films